Celebrity Coach Trip 1 was the first series of Celebrity Coach Trip which was filmed from 6 to 20 September 2010 and began airing on 8 November 2010. The series featured a variety of celebrity couples on a 10-day tour, the couples get to vote off the other couples that they do not get along with. On the last day of the coach trip the remaining couples vote for the couple that they want to win the £1000 prize for charity. The first day of the coach trip started in Prague and the last day of the trip ended in Venice. Tour guide Brendan Sheerin, narrator Dave Vitty, coach driver Paul Donald and the MT09 MTT registration all returned for this series, which aired on Channel 4.

Voting System
The Voting system on this series was:
  Days 1 to 4 was a yellow card
  Days 5 to 9 an automatic red card

Contestants
 Indicates the couple were aboard the coach
 Indicates the couple were immune from votes
 Indicates that the couple were voted as the most popular couple and won series 
 Indicates that the couple were voted as the second most popular couple 
 Indicates that the couple were voted as the third most popular couple
 Indicates the couple got a yellow card
 Indicates the couple got a red card

Voting history

 Indicates that the couple received the most votes and received a yellow card
 Indicates that the couple received the most votes and were red carded off the trip
 Indicates that it was the couple's first vote meaning they could not be voted for
 Indicates that the couple were voted as the most popular couple and won series
 Indicates that the couple were voted as the second most popular couple
 Indicates that the couple were voted as the third most popular couple

The trip by day

References

2010 British television seasons
Coach Trip series
Television shows set in Austria
Television shows set in the Czech Republic
Television shows set in Germany
Television shows set in Italy